The Swinton Estate is a large privately owned estate in North Yorkshire, England. The estate includes Swinton Park, the seat of the Danby family and (from 1882) of the Cunliffe-Lister family (the Earls of Swinton), an English country house in Swinton near Masham. The house is a Grade II* listed building, and now operates as the 42-bedroom Swinton Park Hotel.

The Cunliffe-Lister family still own the house but the seat of the Earl of Swinton is now at Dykes Hill House, also located near Masham.

Beyond the parkland surrounding the house, the estate comprises farmland and large areas of grouse moor in and around the valley of the River Burn.

History
The construction at Swinton Park was commenced in 1695 by Sir Abstrupus Danby (1655–1727). His successors built the stable block and gatehouse and, during the 1760s, planted the parkland and created the chain of five lakes.

William Danby (1752–1833) almost entirely rebuilt the house, at first by John Carr, architect of York, in 1764–67. Danby altered and extended the house, giving it the Gothic aspect it retains, in two building campaigns, to designs of the Yorkshire mason-architect John Foss of Richmond (1745–1827), who became a close personal friend. In the first, of 1791–96, the north range was added. A design for the Drawing Room, at least, was contributed by James Wyatt.  In a second building campaign, of 1813–14, again under the direction of Foss, the south wing was built. The house included a handsome library. 

Danby was not finished: further Gothic alterations were effected by Robert Lugar: turrets and battlements were added, so that the building took on the appearance of a castle; the richly furnished museum of minerals, which has since become a family chapel, was built, and at the same time a tower Describing a tour which he made in 1829, the poet Robert Southey remarked, "The most interesting person whom I saw during this expedition was Mr Danby of Swinton Park, a man of very large fortune, and now very old." During the early 19th century the building was substantially altered, and two-storey west and north wings were added. Danby died in 1833, but his widow continued to live at the house with her second husband, naval officer Octavius Vernon Harcourt (High Sheriff for 1849) until her own death in 1879. She devised her Yorkshire estates to George, fifth son of Sir Robert Affleck, Bt., a member of the family of William Danby's mother, who then took the name Danby. 

The castle was bought in 1888 by Samuel Cunliffe-Lister, who added a third floor and enlarged the dining room.  Samuel's granddaughter Molly and her husband Philip came to live at Swinton in 1924 and took the name of Cunliffe-Lister. Philip was created Viscount Swinton in 1935 and the 1st Earl of Swinton in 1955. During the Second World War Harrogate Ladies College occupied part of the premises. In 1974 Molly Cunliffe-Lister died, and the castellated house was rented out.  

From 1976 to 1998, the castle was occupied by the Lindley Educational Trust. Mark Cunliffe-Lister, the great-grandson of Molly, along with his mother, brother and sister, bought back the castle in May 2000. On 17 June 2000 Mark and Felicity (styled by courtesy as Lord and Lady Masham) married. After their honeymoon, they moved to Swinton and set up the family business here. The 42 bedroom luxury castle hotel was opened in 2001, having undergone extensive refurbishment. The hotel was featured on the BBC television series Amazing Hotels: Life Beyond the Lobby.

Gardens and park
The earliest record of the gardens dates from 1699 when a design by George London was laid out, with fountains added a few years later. A model for a summer house by the carpenter and architect William Thornton was approved by Sir Abstrupus in 1700. This formal plan was swept away, probably by William Danby during his landscaping programme in the 1760s that resulted in the present English landscape garden. In the next years, five lakes were dug out.

The Gothick alterations were accompanied by the Quarry Gill Bridge completed in 1822, also to designs by Foss. During the 1880s a stone bridge was built at Coffin Pond.

The park and garden was listed Grade II* on the Register of Historic Parks and Gardens in 1984.

The parkland supports a herd of approximately 120 fallow deer.

The estate 
The wider estate comprises farmland, woodland and moorland, as well as properties in the town of Masham and nearby villages. The farmland is farmed by more than 50 tenants, with sheep farming predominant.

Most of the moorland falls within the East Nidderdale Moors Site of Special Scientific Interest, and also within the North Pennine Moors Special Area of Conservation (SAC) and Special Protection Area (SPA). The moors are open access land following the Countryside and Rights of Way Act 2000.

The moors are habitat for ground nesting birds, including the hen harrier, which has generated controversy for potential conflict with grouse shoot management. In 2014 a gamekeeper on the Swinton Estate was convicted of setting an illegal pole trap. In 2019 a hen harrier was found shot on the Swinton Estate. According to the Moorland Association there was no evidence of wrongdoing by the estate, and the estate has encouraged the winter roosting and breeding of hen harriers on its land.

References

External links
Swinton Estate website
Swinton Park Culinary School Information
North Yorkshire County Council archives

1690 establishments in England
Country houses in North Yorkshire
Grade II* listed buildings in North Yorkshire
Country estates in England
Grade II* listed parks and gardens in North Yorkshire